Mondovisione is the eleventh studio album by Italian singer-songwriter Luciano Ligabue. Despite being released on 26 November 2013, the record became the best-selling album of the year in Italy, and it was later certified septuple platinum by the Federation of the Italian Music Industry.

Track listing

Charts

Peak positions

Year-end charts

See also
 List of best-selling albums by year (Italy)

References

Italian-language albums
2013 albums